Sacred Heart Convent is a girls' school in Galle, Sri Lanka. The school was established in 1896 by the Sisters of Charity in Belgium due to the urgent need for education of young girls in Galle. Today the Sacred Heart Convent houses a large number of students with over 2,200 students and consists of a tutorial staff amounting to 83 teachers. The present principal of the school is Rev. Sr. Sandya Rani Fernando

References

Girls' schools in Sri Lanka
Educational institutions established in 1896
Schools in Galle
1896 establishments in Ceylon